The Russian Caucasus Army of World War I was the Russian field army that fought in the Caucasus Campaign and Persian Campaign of World War I. It was renowned for inflicting heavy casualties on the opposing forces of the Ottoman Empire, particularly at the Battle of Sarikamish. It was also known for its extremely diverse ethnic composition, consisting of units from throughout the Russian Empire and both soldiers and officers from the many ethnic communities settled since the 1877-78 Russo-Turkish War in the militarily administered Kars Oblast in the Russian Transcaucasus. These included Georgians, Caucasus Greeks, and Armenians - the latter in particular strongly represented among both the soldiers and senior officers - as well as ethnic Russians and Ukrainians.

Period of existence
The Caucasus Army was formed in July 1914 from units of the Caucasus Military District. It ceased to exist in April 1917 when it was reorganized as the Caucasus Front, although this Front contained many of the same units and continued fighting in the same theater. This Front in turn formally ceased to exist in March 1918. It withdrew from Armenia that year.

Organization

Order of Battle, 1914 
The Caucasus Army was under the nominal command of the Governor General of the Caucasus Illarion Vorontsov-Dashkov at the start of hostilities. His chief of command was Aleksandr Zakharevich Myshlayevsky. The Caucasus Army had 100 battalions of infantry, 117 sotnis (cavalry squadrons), and 256 guns for a total of 100,000 troops., in other sources it had had 153 battalions of infantry, 175 sotnis, and 350 guns  Before the war the army was dispersed into two groups according to the two main operating areas: the Kars group (Kars - Erzurum) with 6 divisions in the region of Otu - Sarikamish and the Erivan group (Erivan - Alashkert) with 2 divisions, reinforced by a large number of cavalry, in the vicinity of Igdir.

The flanks were covered by small units formed from the Border Guard, the Cossacks, and the militia. Due to the defeats at the Battle of Tannenberg and the Masurian Lakes, the Russians redeployed almost half their forces to the Prussian front, leaving behind just 65,000 troops from the initial 100,000 to face the Ottoman army.

 Caucasus Army Corps from November 12, 1914 April 2, 1915 Berhman George E.
 2 infantry divisions
 2 cossack rifle brigades
 1st Caucasian Cossack division under command of General Baratov
 Turkistan Army Corps  Lieutenant-General (from 23 October 1914, General of Infantry) Lesh, Leonid Vilgelmovich
 4-I Turkestan Rifle Brigade
 5-I Turkestan Rifle Brigade
 1-I Transcaspian Cossack Brigade
 1st Caucasus Kuban Cossack regiment
 2nd Turkestan Battalion
 Kushkinskaya Oboznaya company

The 1914 engagements were Bergmann Offensive, Ardahan, and Battle of Sarikamish

Order of Battle, 1915 
It was under the nominal command of the Governor General of the Caucasus Nicholas Nikolaevich beginning with the January 1915. His chief of command was Nikolai Yudenich.

 Caucasus Army Corps from February 2, 1915 to 12. March 1917 Kalitin, Pyotr Petrovich
 Turkistan Army Corps  from February 3, 1915 to 3 April 1917 General of Infantry Przewalski, Michael A.

The 1915 engagements were Battle of Dilman, Van, Battle of Manzikert (1915), and Kara Killisse

Order of Battle, 1916 
The 1916 engagements were Erzincan, Erzerum Offensive, Trebizond Campaign, Battle of Bitlis, and Mush.

Order of Battle, 1917 
It was under the nominal command of  Vasily Kharlamov of Transcaucasian Commissariat beginning with the May 1917. His chief of command was  Ilia Odishelidze.

 Caucasus Army Corps from April 12, 1917 Lyakhov, Vladimir Rakhmanov
 Turkistan Army Corps from April 25 to 12 October 1917 - Lt. Gen. Chaplygin, Alexander; 12 October 1917 – ? - Lieutenant General Savitsky, Hippolyte V.

Commanders  
 30.08.1914 – 23.01.1915 — Alexander Myshlayevsky (de facto)
 24.01.1915 – 03.03.1917 — Nikolai Yudenich
 03.04.1917 – 11.09.1917 — Mikhail Przhevalsky 
 05.06.1917 – 16.06.1917 — Nikolai Baratov
 18.06.1917 – 24.10.1917 — Vladimir De Witt
 02.10.1917 – ??.03.1918 — Ilia Odishelidze

Notable officers 
 Georgian Ilia Odishelidze
 Russian  Theodore G. Chernozubov
 Armenian Tovmas Nazarbekian
 Armenian Movses Silikyan

See also
Armenian volunteer units

References 

Caucasus
Ottoman Empire in World War I
Cau
20th century in Armenia
Military units and formations established in 1914
Military units and formations disestablished in 1918